Vladimír Hagara (7 November 1943 – 24 May 2015) was a former Slovak football player. He played for Czechoslovakia national team in 25 matches and scored four goals.

He was a participant at the 1970 FIFA World Cup, where he played in two matches.

Hagara played mostly for Spartak Trnava. At the end of his career played for ZTS Martin.

On 24 May 2015, Hagara was reported dead at the age of 71.

References 

  ČMFS entry

1943 births
Slovak footballers
Czechoslovak footballers
1970 FIFA World Cup players
FC Spartak Trnava players
FC Fastav Zlín players
Czechoslovakia international footballers
Sportspeople from Piešťany
2015 deaths
Association football defenders
FC Nitra players